The following is family tree of the Malay monarchs of Pahang, from the establishment of the Old Pahang Sultanate in 1470 until present day.

House of Melaka-Pahang

House of Bendahara-Pahang
In 1699, following the accession of Abdul Jalil IV from the Bendahara dynasty, as the tenth Sultan of Johor, Pahang was established as a special province of Bendahara (hereditary grand viziers of Johor empire), and ruled by a succession of Bendahara, from Tun Mas Anum (r. 1699–1717) to Tun Hassan (r. 1748–1770). With the decline of Johor from the late 18th century, and the involvement of foreign powers, the Bendahara consolidated their power in Pahang and became increasingly independent. During the reign of Tun Abdul Majid, a semi-independent state Pahang Kingdom was established with Bendahara acquiring similar status as a Raja ('king'). By 1884, the sixth Raja Bendahara, Tun Ahmad was formally proclaimed Sultan.

References

Bibliography
 
 

Pahang